Actinopus insignis is a species of mygalomorph spiders in the family Actinopodidae. It is found in Uruguay and Argentina.

References

insignis
Spiders described in 1881